Gabor Lorant (1930 – April 24, 2005) was a Hungarian architect who specialized in designing earthquake-resistant structures.  Lorant was a freedom fighter in the Hungarian Revolution of 1956, and fled to the United States at the invitation of Frank Lloyd Wright.  Once in the United States, he founded and directed Gabor Lorant Architects, Inc., an architectural firm that has designed buildings in 42 states and 3 countries.

In 1997, Lorant represented the American Institute of Architects at the international conference "Assuring the Performance of Buildings and Infrastructures," an international conference convened in Albuquerque, New Mexico.  Additionally, he was the author of "Seismic Design Principles," a technical manual on constructing earthquake-resistant buildings.  In recognition of his contributions to the field, Lorant was granted Fulbright Scholarships in 1999 through 2005, and was awarded fellowship in the American Institute of Architects.

Lorant served as the co-chair of the Phoenix Mountain Preservation Committee, and the Chairman of the Phoenix Environmental Commission.  He also designed and built his own home near the Phoenix Mountain Preserve in mid-century modern style.  Lorant died in Hungary in 2005 but Gabor Lorant Architects, Inc. remains active, now under the leadership of his son, Jan Lorant.

References

External links
Website of Gabor Lorant Architects Inc.

1930 births
2005 deaths
20th-century Hungarian architects
Architects from Arizona
Hungarian architects
Hungarian expatriates in the United States
Fellows of the American Institute of Architects